Vítor Emanuel Gonçalves São Bento (born 9 August 1992) is a Portuguese professional footballer who plays as a goalkeeper for S.C. Covilhã.

Club career

Portugal
Born in Galegos (Santa Maria), Barcelos, São Bento played youth football with four clubs, including local Santa Maria F.C. from ages 9 to 16. His senior debut was made with Varzim SC, in the third division.

São Bento signed with S.C. Farense of the Segunda Liga in 2013. His first match in the competition occurred on 11 May 2014, in a 2–1 away loss against S.C. Beira-Mar which was his only appearance of the season.

In the 2015–16 campaign, São Bento only missed three matches in 46 but the Algarve side finished in 20th position and were relegated. In January 2016, he was voted Best Young Player for the previous month.

On 31 May 2016, São Bento joined C.D. Nacional on a four-year contract. Nearly one year later, as his team had already been relegated, he made his Primeira Liga debut, replacing the habitual starter Adriano Facchini midway through the second half of the 2–2 away draw with Boavista FC.

São Bento returned to the second tier for 2017–18, agreeing to a deal at S.C. Covilhã.

Xanthi
On 14 June 2019, São Bento moved abroad for the first time in his career, signing a contract with Xanthi FC.

References

External links

Portuguese League profile 

1992 births
Living people
People from Barcelos, Portugal
Sportspeople from Braga District
Portuguese footballers
Association football goalkeepers
Primeira Liga players
Liga Portugal 2 players
Segunda Divisão players
Santa Maria F.C. players
Varzim S.C. players
S.C. Farense players
C.D. Nacional players
S.C. Covilhã players
C.F. Estrela da Amadora players
C.D. Trofense players
Super League Greece players
Football League (Greece) players
Xanthi F.C. players
Portuguese expatriate footballers
Expatriate footballers in Greece
Portuguese expatriate sportspeople in Greece